The 2019 Purdue Fort Wayne Mastodons baseball team was a baseball team that represented Purdue University Fort Wayne in the 2019 NCAA Division I baseball season. The Mastodons were members of the Summit League and played their home games at Mastodon Field in Fort Wayne, Indiana. They were led by eleventh-year head coach Bobby Pierce.

Previous season
The Mastodons finished the 2018 NCAA Division I baseball season 11–37 overall (7–23 conference) and sixth place in conference standings. Following the conclusion of the regular season, the Mastodons failed to qualify to play in the 2018 NCAA Tournament.

Roster

Schedule

! style="" | Regular Season
|- valign="top" 

|- bgcolor="#ccffcc"
| 1 || February 15 || at  || Bulldog Field • Huntsville, Alabama || 10–2 || Phelps (1–0) || Diaz (0–1) || None || 25 || 1–0 || 0–0
|- bgcolor="#ccffcc"
| 2 || February 16 || at Alabama A&M || Bulldog Field • Huntsville, Alabama || 9–8 || Kissinger (1–0) || Figueroa (0–1) || Ferguson (1) || 25 || 2–0 || 0–0
|- bgcolor="#ccffcc"
| 3 || February 16 || at Alabama A&M || Bulldog Field • Huntsville, Alabama || 5–4 || Armstrong (1–0) || Mendoza (0–1) || Strobel (1) || 25 || 3–0 || 0–0
|- bgcolor="#ccffcc"
| 4 || February 17 || at Alabama A&M || Bulldog Field • Huntsville, Alabama || 6–5 || Armstrong (2–0) || Caver (0–1) || Ferguson (2) || 25 || 4–0 || 0–0
|- bgcolor="#ffcccc"
| 5 || February 22 || at  || Wheeler–Watkins Baseball Complex • Montgomery, Alabama || 7–14 || Wright (1–0) || Armstrong (2–1) || None || 275 || 4–1 || 0–0
|- bgcolor="#ffcccc"
| 6 || February 23 || at Alabama State || Wheeler–Watkins Baseball Complex • Montgomery, Alabama || 1–7 || Kelly (1–0) || Boyd (0–1) || None || 181 || 4–2 || 0–0
|- bgcolor="#ffcccc"
| 7 || February 24 || at Alabama State || Wheeler–Watkins Baseball Complex • Montgomery, Alabama || 9–10 || Rivera (1–0) || Ju. Miller (0–1) || None || 109 || 4–3 || 0–0
|-

|- bgcolor="#ffcccc"
| 8 || March 1 || at  || Capaha Field • Cape Girardeau, Missouri || 4–12 || Dodd (1–1) || Phelps (1–1) || None || 233 || 4–4 || 0–0
|- bgcolor="#ffcccc"
| 9 || March 2 || at Southeast Missouri State || Capaha Field • Cape Girardeau, Missouri || 1–10 || Niznik (2–0) || Boyd (0–2) || None || 278 || 4–5 || 0–0
|- bgcolor="#ffcccc"
| 10 || March 3 || at Southeast Missouri State || Capaha Field • Cape Girardeau, Missouri || 1–14 || Bergtholdt (2–0) || Odzark (0–1) || None || 278 || 4–6 || 0–0
|- bgcolor="#ffcccc"
| 11 || March 7 || at  || Woerner Field • Dayton, Ohio, || 3–9 || Wagner (1–0) || Ju. Miller (0–2) || None || 48 || 4–7 || 0–0
|- bgcolor="#ffcccc"
| 12 || March 9 || vs  || Bill Aker Baseball Complex • Highland Heights, Kentucky, || 1–7 || Pepiot (1–1) || Boyd (0–3) || None || 52 || 4–8 || 0–0
|- bgcolor="#ffcccc"
| 13 || March 10 || vs Butler || Bill Aker Baseball Complex • Highland Heights, Kentucky || 3–18 || Hubbe (2–0) || Phelps (1–2) || None || 108 || 4–9 || 0–0
|- bgcolor="#ffcccc"
| 14 || March 10 || vs Butler || Bill Aker Baseball Complex • Highland Heights, Kentucky || 0–16 || Schultz (3–0) || Odzark (0–2) || None || 74 || 4–10 || 0–0
|- bgcolor="#ffcccc"
| 15 || March 12 || at  || Ball Diamond • Muncie, Indiana || 6–11 || Floyd (3–0) || Armstrong (2–1) || None || 333 || 4–11 || 0–0
|- bgcolor="#ffcccc"
| 16 || March 15 || at  || J. L. Johnson Stadium • Tulsa, Oklahoma || 3–13 || McMinn (3–2) || Boyd (0–4) || None || 617 || 4–12 || 0–1
|- bgcolor="#ffcccc"
| 17 || March 16 || at Oral Roberts || J. L. Johnson Stadium • Tulsa, Oklahoma || 4–20 || Gaskins (2–1) || Phelps (1–3) || None || 684 || 4–13 || 0–2
|- bgcolor="#ffcccc"
| 18 || March 17 || at Oral Roberts || J. L. Johnson Stadium • Tulsa, Oklahoma || 5–7 || Rainwater (1–0) || Odzark (0–3) || Henson (1) || 663 || 4–14 || 0–3
|- bgcolor="#ffcccc"
| 19 || March 20 || at Ball State || Ball Diamond • Muncie, Indiana || 11–12 || McGill (1–0) || Kissinger (1–1) || None || 222 || 4–15 || 0–3
|- bgcolor="#ffcccc"
| 20 || March 22 || at  || Skutt Catholic High School • Omaha, Nebraska, || 4–11 || Machado (3–1) || Boyd (0–5) || Daugherty (5) || 176 || 4–16 || 0–4
|- bgcolor="#ffcccc"
| 21 || March 23 || at Omaha || Creighton Preparatory School  • Omaha, Nebraska || 1–6 || Kinney (5–0) || Phelps (1–4) || None || 188 || 4–17 || 0–5
|- bgcolor="#ffcccc"
| 22 || March 24 || at Omaha || Creighton Preparatory School  • Omaha, Nebraska || 0–26 || Koelewyn (3–1) || Odzark (0–4) || None || 176 || 4–18 || 0–6
|- bgcolor="#bbbbbb"
| 23 || March 28 ||  || Mastodon Field • Fort Wayne, Indiana || Cancelled || – || – || – || – || – || –
|- bgcolor="#ffcccc"
| 24 || March 29 ||  || Mastodon Field • Fort Wayne, Indiana || 4–5 || Barnett (4–0) || Kissinger (1–2) || Beazley (3) || 110 || 4–19 || 0–7
|- bgcolor="#ffcccc"
| 25 || March 29 || South Dakota State || Mastodon Field • Fort Wayne, Indiana || 2–12 || Froom (3–1) || Phelps (1–5) || None || 111 || 4–20 || 0–8
|- bgcolor="#ffcccc"
| 26 || March 31 || South Dakota State || Frank Eck Stadium • Notre Dame, Indiana || 0–8 || McCay (4–1) || Odzark (0–5) || None || 33 || 4–21 || 0–9
|-

|- bgcolor="#ccffcc"
| 27 || April 2 ||  || Mastodon Field • Fort Wayne, Indiana || 11–9 || Kissinger (2–2) || Fox (1–2) || Phelps (1) || 83 || 5–21 || 0–9
|- bgcolor="#ffcccc"
| 28 || April 5 || at  || Newman Outdoor Field • Fargo, North Dakota || 8–17 || Harm (3–1) || Boyd (0–6) || None || 110 || 5–22 || 0–10
|- bgcolor="#ffcccc"
| 29 || April 6 || at North Dakota State || Newman Outdoor Field • Fargo, North Dakota || 4–5 || Harms (1–0) || Hill (0–1) || None || 110 || 5–23 || 0–11
|- bgcolor="#ffcccc"
| 30 || April 7 || at North Dakota State || Newman Outdoor Field • Fargo, North Dakota  || 0–7 || Smith (2–2) || Odzark (0–6) || None || 110 || 5–24 || 0–12
|- bgcolor="#ffcccc"
| 31 || April 10 ||  || Mastodon Field • Fort Wayne, Indiana || 4–10 || Buratto (2–0) || Armstrong (2–2) || Spezia (4) || 101 || 5–25 || 0–12
|- bgcolor="#ffcccc"
| 32 || April 12 || at  || Alfred D. Boyer Stadium • Macomb, Illinois, || 4–14 || Warkentien (2–2) || Boyd (0–7) || None || 129 || 5–26 || 0–13
|- bgcolor="#ffcccc"
| 33 || April 13 || at Western Illinois || Alfred D. Boyer Stadium • Macomb, Illinois || 2–4 || Drake (4–3) || Phelps (1–6) || Foy (1) || 146 || 5–27 || 0–14
|- bgcolor="#ffcccc"
| 34 || April 13 || at Western Illinois || Alfred D. Boyer Stadium • Macomb, Illinois || 0–10 || Carberry (5–1) || Ju. Miller (0–3) || None || 129 || 5–28 || 0–15
|- bgcolor="#ffcccc"
| 35 || April 17 ||  || Mastodon Field • Fort Wayne, Indiana || 7–11 || Calopietro (2–0) || Kissinger (2–3) || None || 121 || 5–29 || 0–15
|- bgcolor="#ffcccc"
| 36 || April 19 || Omaha || Mastodon Field • Fort Wayne, Indiana || 0–5 || Machado (5–1) || Boyd (0–8) || None || 83 || 5–30 || 0–16
|- bgcolor="#ffcccc"
| 37 || April 21 || Omaha || Mastodon Field • Fort Wayne, Indiana || 2–13 || Kinney (8–0) || Phelps (1–7) || None || 204 || 5–31 || 0–17
|- bgcolor="#ffcccc"
| 38 || April 21 || Omaha || Mastodon Field • Fort Wayne, Indiana || 2–4 || Koelewyn (4–1) || Ju. Miller (0–4) || Hehnke (5) || 211 || 5–32 || 0–18
|- bgcolor="#ffcccc"
| 39 || April 24 || at Purdue || Alexander Field • West Lafayette, Indiana || 2–11 || P. J. Smith (4–3) || Odzark (0–7) || None || 1,370 || 5–33 || 0–18
|- bgcolor="#ffcccc"
| 40 || April 26 || Oral Roberts || Mastodon Field • Fort Wayne, Indiana || 2–25 || McMinn (6–3) || Boyd (0–9) || None || 102 || 5–34 || 0–19
|- bgcolor="#ffcccc"
| 41 || April 27 || Oral Roberts || Mastodon Field • Fort Wayne, Indiana || 0–10 || Gaskins (3–3) || Kissinger (2–4) || None || 115 || 5–35 || 0–20
|- bgcolor="#ffcccc"
| 42 || April 28 || Oral Roberts || Mastodon Field • Fort Wayne, Indiana || 0–14 || Coffey (2–2) || Ju. Miller (0–5) || None || 115 || 5–36 || 0–21
|- bgcolor="#bbbbbb"
| 43 || April 30 || Butler || Mastodon Field • Fort Wayne, Indiana || Cancelled || – || – || – || – || – || –
|-

|- bgcolor="#ffcccc"
| 44 || May 3 || at South Dakota State || Erv Huether Field • Brookings, South Dakota || 0–8 || Olmstead (4–3) || Boyd (0–10) || None || 204 || 5–37 || 0–22
|- bgcolor="#ffcccc"
| 45 || May 4 || at South Dakota State || Erv Huether Field • Brookings, South Dakota || 4–7 || Barnett (5–1) || Phelps (1–8) || None || 246 || 5–38 || 0–23
|- bgcolor="#ffcccc"
| 46 || May 5 || at South Dakota State || Erv Huether Field • Brookings, South Dakota || 2–12 || McCay (5–1) || Ju. Miller (0–6) || None || 159 || 5–39 || 0–24
|- bgcolor="#ffcccc"
| 47 || May 7 || at Bowling Green || Steller Field • Bowling Green, Ohio, || 1–3 || Egnor (1–4) || Odzark (0–8) || Speiza (5) || 157 || 5–40 || 0–24
|- bgcolor="#ccffcc"
| 48 || May 10 || North Dakota State || Mastodon Field • Fort Wayne, Indiana || 6–5 || Armstrong (3–2) || Harm (4–5) || D. Miller (1) || 107 || 6–40 || 1–24
|- bgcolor="#ffcccc"
| 49 || May 11 || North Dakota State || Mastodon Field • Fort Wayne, Indiana || 7–20 || Smith (4–2) || Boyd (0–11) || None || 106 || 6–41 || 1–25
|- bgcolor="#ffcccc"
| 50 || May 12 || North Dakota State || Mastodon Field • Fort Wayne, Indiana || 9–11 || Tritch (1–0) || Kissinger (2–5) || Harms (2) || 145 || 6–42 || 1–26
|- bgcolor="#ffcccc"
| 51 || May 14 || at Toledo || Scott Park Baseball Complex • Toledo, Ohio, || 8–13 || Davis (2–2) || Odzark (0–9) || None || 170 || 6–43 || 1–26
|- bgcolor="#ccffcc"
| 52 || May 16 || Western Illinois || Mastodon Field • Fort Wayne, Indiana || 8–6 || D. Miller (1–0) || Emanuel (2–3) || None || 146 || 7–43 || 2–26
|- bgcolor="#ffcccc"
| 53 || May 17 || Western Illinois || Mastodon Field • Fort Wayne, Indiana || 1–4 || Drake (7–5) || Boyd (0–12) || Rektorski (1) || 189 || 7–44 || 2–27
|- bgcolor="#ffcccc"
| 54 || May 18 || Western Illinois || Mastodon Field • Fort Wayne, Indiana || 3–13 || Dorethy (2–4) || Ju. Miller (0–7) || None || 202 || 7–45 || 2–28
|-

See also
 2019 Summit League baseball tournament
 2019 NCAA Division I baseball tournament

References

Purdue Fort Wayne
Purdue Fort Wayne Mastodons baseball seasons
Purdue Fort Wayne